The Roman Catholic Diocese of Toledo is a diocese located in the city of Toledo in the Ecclesiastical province of Cascavel in Brazil.

History
 June 20, 1959: Established as Diocese of Toledo from the Territorial Prelature of Foz do Iguaçu

Bishops
 Bishops of Toledo (Latin Church), in reverse chronological order
 Bishop João Carlos Seneme (2013.06.26 – ...)
 Bishop Francisco Carlos Bach (2005.07.27 – 2012.10.03), appointed Bishop of São José dos Pinhais, Parana
 Bishop Anuar Battisti (1998.04.15 – 2004.09.29), appointed Archbishop of Maringá, Parana
 Bishop Lúcio Ignácio Baumgaertner (1983.07.02 – 1995.12.27), appointed Archbishop of Cascavel
 Bishop Geraldo Majella Agnelo (1978.05.05 – 1982.10.04), appointed Archbishop of Londrina, Parana; future Cardinal
 Bishop Armando Círio, O.S.I. (1960.05.14 – 1978.05.05), appointed Bishop of Cascavel; future archbishop

Other priests of this diocese who became bishops
Irineu Roque Scherer, appointed Bishop of Garanhuns, Pernambuco in 1998
Odilo Pedro Scherer,  appointed Auxiliary Bishop of São Paulo in 2001; future Cardinal

References

External links
 GCatholic.org
 Catholic Hierarchy
  Diocese website (Portuguese)

Roman Catholic dioceses in Brazil
Christian organizations established in 1959
Toledo, Roman Catholic Diocese of
Roman Catholic dioceses and prelatures established in the 20th century
Toledo, Paraná